Case Solved is a 2017 Philippine television drama documentary anthology broadcast by GMA Network. Hosted by Dingdong Dantes, it premiered on February 18, 2017 on the network's Sabado Star Power sa Hapon line up replacing Hashtag Like. The show concluded on March 25, 2017 with a total of 6 episodes. It was replaced by Ika-6 na Utos in its timeslot.

Ratings
According to AGB Nielsen Philippines' Nationwide Urban Television Audience Measurement, the pilot episode of Case Solved earned a 14.2% rating.

References

External links
 

2017 Philippine television series debuts
2017 Philippine television series endings
Filipino-language television shows
GMA Network original programming
Philippine anthology television series
Philippine television docudramas
Television shows set in the Philippines